Panama Joe Gans was a black boxer who held the World Colored Middleweight Championship for four years, shortly before it was discontinued.  Born Cyril Quinton Jr. on November 14, 1896 in Barbados, British West Indies and raised in the Panama Canal Zone, the 5'7" Quinton originally fought out of Panama and then New York City. He took his ringname from boxing great Joe Gans, the first black American fighter to win a world boxing title. He found his greatest fame fighting as a middleweight at between 147 and 160 lbs, but in his early career he took the Panamanian Lightweight Title and contended for the Panamanian Welterweight Title at weights roughly between 130 and 147 pounds.

Early life
Panama Joe Gans was born Cyril Quinton Jr. on November 4, 1896 on the small tropical Island of Barbados. His family moved to Colon, Panama while he was still a child. After his father died when he was very young, he was detained by local authorities for stealing fish and spent the next five years in a detention center.  At the center, he learned the basic aspects of boxing by partaking in bouts organized by his classmates. Under the guidance of H.R. Cambridge, a local Panamanian business manager, and real estate developer, Quinton adopted his ring name, and became a successful boxer in the Canal Zone where he fought his first thirty fights with considerable success.

Taking the Panamanian Light and Middleweight Championships
On October 10, 1915, Panama Joe first won the Lightweight Championship of Panama at only eighteen against Young Sam Langford at the Pacific Theatre in Panama City in a twenty-round points decision. He later took the Middleweight Championship of Panama by knocking out Benny McGovern in the third of fifteen rounds on November 30, 1916 at the Santa Ana Plaza in Panama City. At the time, these titles were often described as extending to both Central and South America.

In his first bout after taking the Middleweight Championship of Panama on December 12, 1916, though barely twenty-one years old, he soundly defeated Abraham Jacob Hollandersky, a former holder of the Panamanian Heavyweight Championship in 20 rounds in Panama City.

Moving to New York in 1917
In 1917, Panama Joe was brought to New York by the talented boxing manager Leo P. Flynn, and settled in Harlem. Some of his important early victories were against the Jamaica Kid, Cleve Hawkins and Battling Thomas.

Wins that brought attention to Gans, 1919–20
Gans had an important early career win against Jeff Smith on July 8, 1919, in an eight-round newspaper decision of the Philadelphia Inquirer at Atlantic City. On October 23, 1919, he made a very strong showing against well known boxer Bert Kenney in an eight-round newspaper decision in Atlantic City, New Jersey. Kenney had been an opponent of Jack Dempsey in 1916. On May 24, 1920, Gans made a splash in the boxing world by knocking out Young Fisher in the fifth round at Rochester, New York. On June 15 of that year, Gans would defeat Fisher again in a ten-round newspaper decision. Rather than acting as a lever to gain access to more lucrative opponents, several boxing historians wrote than these wins, and Gans' exceptional record may have made it more difficult for him to sign for a bout with a white Middleweight championship contender.

Serving as a sparring partner for Jack Dempsey, 1920
Gans worked as a sparring partner for Jack Dempsey prior to his a bout with future Hall of Fame boxer Billy Miske in early September 1920. The speed and skill he demonstrated in his fast sparring matches with Dempsey won him attention with the press, and the boxing public. The publicity he gained helped him secure a shot at the Colored World Middleweight Championship.

World Colored Middleweight Title, October 1920

Panama Joe won the World Colored Middleweight Championship from Bostonian George Robinson in Madison Square Garden on October 8, 1920 in a twelve-round points decision. Panama Joe weighed 151 and Robinson weighed 150, in the light middleweight range. It was the first time two black boxers were featured on a fight card at the Garden, though typical of the era, the coverage of the fight was brief in those few newspapers that covered it. The fighting was described as fierce and drawing blood by one source. Blackburn was fighting one of the last matches of his career and was 40 at the time of the bout, ancient for a highly rated boxer, even in 1922. He had a three-inch advantage in reach and height, but it did not compensate for his age and declining stamina. Blackburn had fought many of the greatest boxers of his era, including Sam Langford, Kid Norfolk, and champions Joe Gans, Harry Greb, Harry Lewis, and Mike Twin Sullivan.

On February 17, 1923, Panama Joe defeated Jimmy O'Gatty in a fifth-round knockout at the Commonwealth Sporting Club in New York City.

Defenses of the Colored World Middleweight Championship
Gans defended the Colored Middleweight Title three times in 1923. He won a ten-round newspaper decision against Whitey Black on May 14 in Detroit. Meeting Black again on October 22, 1923, he knocked him out in Rochester, New York in the eighth of a scheduled non-title ten round bout, but the fight was investigated as neither man appeared to have landed a telling blow in the bout, and Black had been warned against not putting up a serious fight.

Bouts with future World Champion Tiger Flowers, 1921–23
Panama Joe fought Tiger Flowers in Toledo, Ohio, on May 25, 1923, in a twelve-round, no-decision bout, in which the Toledo News Bee reported that Flowers seemed to have had an edge in every round, but Gans' World Middleweight Title was not at stake as Ohio did not allow decisions. Flowers had a three-inch reach advantage over Gans, and may have fought with a weight advantage in the bout as well. Even though Gans had beaten Flowers twice previously, Gans' manager, Leo Flynn refused to have Panama Joe meet Flowers for a fourth time, though the purse offered was very large. The Atlanta Constitution noted that Flowers had "badly beaten" Panama Joe in their May bout.

Win over future World Champion Tiger Flowers, 1921
Impressively, on August 8, 1921, Panama Joe knocked out Flowers in the sixth round at the Auditorium in Atlanta, Georgia. Famed sportswriter Damon Runyon noted prior to the fight that Panama Joe had a better claim to the Middleweight Title than two of the primary white contenders, Bostonian Italian Johnny Wilson, who first took the title in 1920, and Bryan Downey, who contended for the title once in July 1921 against Wilson. On December 15, 1921, Gans had decisively beaten Flowers in a fifth-round knockout at the Auditorium in Atlanta, Georgia. These were impressive wins as Flowers would become the first African American to hold the World Middleweight Championship in 1926.

At 149 1/2 pounds, on November 18, 1922, Gans defeated Jewish New York boxer Marty Cross before a large crowd in twelve rounds at the Commonwealth Sports Club in the Bronx in a twelve-round points decision. Cross had a three-inch reach advantage over Gans.  He was a brother of the great lightweight boxer Leach Cross. Gans was the winner on points in every round, but in the ninth he was nearly knocked out by a single punch to the midsection. Gans recovered from the blow and came back strongly in the following round, continuing to press his advantage and bringing Cross close to a knockout. Gans had promised to forfeit his Middleweight Championship bout if he lost the fight.

On May 30, 1923, Panama Joe defeated well known competitor Willie Walker in New York in a ninth-round knockout.

Win over Italian Joe Gans, 1923
On September 15, 1923, Panama Joe Gans defeated quality competitor Italian Joe Gans before a crowd that packed the Commonwealth Sporting Club in New York in an important twelve round points decision. Panama Joe was the aggressor and appeared to outpoint Italian Joe in each of the fast rounds. In the late rounds, Italian Joe swung wide of his mark and could not penetrate the defense of Panama Joe. Panama Joe had previously lost to Gans on February 6, 1923 in a twelve-round points decision at New York's Pioneer Sporting Club.

Contracting pneumonia again, December 1923
Around late December 1923, after a loss to Morrie Sclaiffer in Omaha, Nebraska, Panama Joe disastrously contracted pneumonia for a second time. Doctors strongly discouraged him from continuing his boxing, and he was bed-ridden for two months. Gans took only a four-month period of recuperation before resuming a career as a competitor, though he would never again compete on the world stage. His loss of the Colored title to Larry Estridge only six months later was likely a result of the endurance he had lost to his illness.

Win over Andy "Kid" Palmer
Gans defeated Andy "Kid" Palmer in their first meeting on January 6, 1923 in a twelve-round points decision at New York's Commonwealth Sporting Club. They had met earlier on October 27, 1922, in the feature bout at Brooklyn's Rink Sporting Club. Gans had been uncharacteristically disqualified for a low blow in the sixth round, after having been warned twice previously for hitting low. Gans had started well in the first few rounds, but subsequently took a beating from the short jabs of Palmer.

Losing the Colored World Middleweight Championship, June 1924
Only six months after his second battle with pneumonia, Panama Joe lost his title to Larry Estridge in a decisive ten round unanimous decision at Yankee Stadium in the Bronx on June 26, 1924. Panama Joe was floored three times in the bout, and was cut by the swinging jabs of his southpaw challenger. Gans was down by the second round, and may have been woozy in the remaining eight, where he gamely took a serious battering, but fought on. Estridge was twenty-two to Panama Joe's twenty-eight years and had a six-pound weight advantage which may have played a factor in the bout.

Estridge successfully defended the title in a rematch with Gans at Queensboro Stadium in Long Island City, Queens, New York on August 11, 1924 before a crowd of 16,000. Panama Joe once again took a battering in the match. It was Estridge's sole title defense. The title went into abeyance after Tiger Flowers became the first black boxer to win the world middleweight championship when he defeated Harry Greb in 1926.

According to BoxRec, Panama Joe's last recorded fight was at Balboa Stadium in Mayaguez, Puerto Rico against Francisco Soler on June 10, 1928.  Panama Joe lost the ten round bout.

Panama Joe's professional boxing career extended for a period of roughly fifteen years.  Little has been published about his later life or his death.

Professional boxing record
All information in this section is derived from BoxRec, unless otherwise stated.

Official record

All newspaper decisions are officially regarded as “no decision” bouts and are not counted in the win/loss/draw column.

Unofficial record

Record with the inclusion of newspaper decisions in the win/loss/draw column.

Achievements

References

External links
 
 Professional Boxing Record for Panama Joe Gans, Cyber Boxing Zone

1896 births
Middleweight boxers
World colored middleweight boxing champions
Barbadian male boxers
Year of death missing
British male boxers